Lasionycta draudti is a moth of the family Noctuidae. It is found in Turkey and Russia.

Lasionycta
Insects of Turkey
Moths described in 1936